The Banff Centre Mountain Film Festival is an international film competition and annual presentation of films and documentaries about mountain culture, sports, environment and adventure & exploration. It was launched in 1976 as The Banff Festival of Mountain Films by The Banff Centre and is held every fall in Banff, Alberta. Held concurrently is the Banff Mountain Book Festival, which brings the spirit of mountain literature to Banff, and features guest speakers, readings, seminars, and an international book competition.

Immediately after the festival in November, a selection of the best films entered in the festival goes on tour. The host organization in each tour location chooses a program that reflects the interests of their community. Each community creates a unique celebration of local adventure and adventurers. The World Tour visits approximately 800 cities annually in over 40 countries, reaching over 500,000 audience members.

Film selection
Approximately 400 films are entered into the film festival annually, and approx. 70 - 80 films are selected by a pre-screening committee and the festival team to be shown at the festival. During the festival, the international film festival jury chooses the best films and presents awards in various categories. 

Every year the Banff World Tour team chooses about 35 - 40 films that feature a range of styles and themes, including climbing, skiing, kayaking, biking, adventure, culture, and the environment. The hosts try to choose the films that are best suited for their local audience and event. Most World Tour screenings include a range of different themes (adventure sports, environment, mountain culture, heritage, etc.) and styles (action-filled shorts; longer, more comprehensive films; amateur and professional productions; etc.). 

Finding Farley was the top film at the 2009 Banff Mountain Film Festival, receiving both the Grand Prize and People's Choice Award.

Mi Chacra, directed and produced by Jason Burlage, was the top film at the 2010 Banff Mountain Film Festival, receiving the Grand Prize.

Music of Banff
The music was composed by Jacques Blackstone. He was commissioned in the late 1990s by Banff Centre to write a theme for the festival. 
The "voice" for the intro is provided by Richard Armstrong, a New York-based teacher and performer who conducts International Voice Workshops. The film clips come from the films that are entered in each year's festival.

Gallery

See also
Mike Mortimer
Banff Mountain Book Festival
Festivals in Alberta
Mountain film

References

External links
Banff Mountain Festivals web site
Banff Centre

Film festivals in Alberta
Festivals in Banff, Alberta
Mountaineering festivals
Mountaineering in Canada